George Washington Woodbey (October 5, 1854 – August 27, 1937) was an influential African-American minister, author and Socialist. He wrote several influential papers about Socialism and African Americans, ministered in churches in the Midwestern United States and California, and served as the sole Black delegate to the Socialist Party of America conventions in 1904 and 1908.

Biography

Early years

Woodbey was born into slavery in Johnson County, Tennessee, to Charles and Rachel Woodbey. Little is known about his childhood, though it is reported that he learned to read at a young age. Following the conclusion of the Civil War, Woodbey made his way to Emporia, Kansas and was ordained a Baptist minister in 1874. He ministered in churches in Nebraska, Kansas and Missouri.

Woodbey became active in the Republican Party and by the 1880s became interested in social reform.  In Omaha he joined the Prohibition Party and ran on their ticket for Lieutenant Governor of Nebraska in 1890. He was Nebraska's Prohibition Party's candidate for Congress in 1894.

In the 1900 Presidential campaigns, Woodbey supported the Democratic and Populist candidate William Jennings Bryan of Nebraska.  During this period Woodbey became familiar with the ideas of Eugene Debs, a labor organizer and future five-time Socialist candidate for president. The Democratic Party invited Woodbey to deliver speeches, but then cut him off because he was too strongly socialist.

Socialist
Woodbey became a member of the Socialist Party. He never took the Socialist Party to task on the question of race, even after his own nomination for vice presidential candidate was met with only one vote.  Woodbey believed the Socialist Party could help solve racial problems in the United States because of its emphasis on economic changes to the system. Woodbey also saw the struggle for socialism as an extension of the struggle against slavery: as the Civil War had ended chattel slavery, so would the replacement of capitalism with socialism abolish wage slavery. Woodbey directly compared the means of repression used to discipline slaves and the working class, stating: "In the days of chattel slavery the masters had a patrol force to keep the negroes in their place and protect the interests of the masters. Today the capitalists use the police for the same purpose".

Woodbey also noted the emergence of class stratification among the black community, and expressed skepticism regarding relying on upper-class black leadership in the fight against racism, noting that whilst many believed "the accumulation of wealth in the hands of a few Negroes will solve this problem... a few white men have all the wealth and the rest of their brothers are getting poorer every day". Like Eugene Debs, he was also notable for his opposition to the anti-immigrant sentiments that were commonplace in the American labor movement and the Socialist Party at the time.

He promoted the causes of socialism across California and was recognized as one of the great socialist orators of the time. His ability to bring his message to the common man made him a reputation on the streets. On one occasion, Woodbey was denied access to a restaurant due to his race. He turned the situation around by putting together a successful boycott of the restaurant and hotel with the help of socialist comrades.

In 1902 Woodbey moved to San Diego, where he was pastor of Mt. Zion Baptist Church.  He served on the executive board of the Socialist Party of California, and traveled around the state in his work.  He believed that the socialist message of helping the poor was consistent with his Christian beliefs.

Because of the inflammatory nature of his message, Woodbey was in and out of jail for several years. In 1905, after one particular incident, the police hospitalized the orator. He organized a protest and went to the county jail to lodge a formal complaint. His complaint was met by being physically thrown from the building. Woodbey would then press charges of assault and battery on the officer. The case was taken to court and a jury found the defendant not guilty. The verdict was not what Woodbey was looking for, but it gave him an unexpected boost with the community. The event also allowed him to demonize the police as shills for the capitalist machine.

Political ideas
George Washington Woodbey published several works on the ideas of socialism, one of which is What to do and how to do it published in 1903. The purpose of this pamphlet was to reach out to those citizens who didn't understand socialism's ideals or how those ideals might be implemented once socialism was adopted by the American people. Woodbey was a natural orator, and this pamphlet was a response to a request for a written collective of his socialist talks. Woodbey uses a visit to his mother after a 17-year absence to structure the pamphlet and give it a more approachable tone that an everyday person could understand. Woodbey makes it clear immediately that his socialist beliefs are all related to the Christian teachings of the Bible, not in conflict with them as many Christians believed at the time, by citing Genesis, Exodus, Samuel, Leviticus, Nehemiah, Isaiah, and Matthew just in the Introduction. 
His teachings are all based on the Christian belief that as God made the Earth and everything on it for the purpose of human use and survival; it and everything on it therefore belongs to the human race as a whole and cannot be owned or sold. However he also makes it clear that one does not have to be Christian to be socialist or vis versa, because people of all creeds can at the very least agree that humans rely on the Earth for survival. He goes on to support freedom of religion for all people.

Woodbey describes the major flaw in capitalism as people paying for what they have already earned through work. As all people have a right to the Earth and its resources, paying another person rent for the ability to live on Earth that is already rightfully theirs is wrong. He cites philosophers Karl Marx and Herbert Spencer in support of not owning or selling land.

Woodbey argues that capital, like the tools and machines for work, is created by labor, so a capitalist who is not producing anything for society but rather exploiting the production of the laborers is further separating the classes of society so that the poor get poorer and the rich get richer, further dividing society. Capitalism also creates an economy in which a limited number of individuals can be successful. Saving one's wages could be a way to better their station in society, but as the economy is powered by spending, saving is not effective if the majority do it because it eliminates the market for what they are producing.

In the next section of the pamphlet, Woodbey explains the goals of the socialist party. In a socialist society, all people would work together, all owning equally land, machines, tools, and roads so that none would need to pay for what their labor produced. It's like a family who runs a farm and does not need to pay for the food they produce because they've already paid for it through work, just on a much larger scale. Woodbey lists four things that socialists want:

 All people to have equal interest in the land because all people need the Earth to survive.
 All people to own the tools with which they do work. Tools are defined as everything from a screwdriver to a large manufacturing facility.
 All people to own equally all modes of transportation both for themselves and their goods.
 The working class to make all the laws over industry by direct vote.

The existence of these four things in society would create a society that celebrates the labors of the working class and recognizes their importance. The over-all equality between people in the socialist system is something that ties racial issues very close to socialism. Woodbey felt that a system of total equality would have helped African-Americans to obtain the freedoms and justice that they were denied.
Woodbey argued that at the time of publication, socialism was going through a period of agitation in which many intelligent socialists were spreading the ideals and goals of socialism to create more socialists. He predicted that socialism would grow tremendously and influence governments all over the world.

He describes a socialist government as needing very few laws. He argues that with equal ownership and concern for society's production, men would no longer be swayed to illegal acts for monetary gain. He proposes a system in which any citizen can propose a law, and with enough support (he suggests 5% of the population) the law would be presented for vote. If a majority were in support of it, it would become a law. Woodbey does not mention or distinguish between State and Federal government in this section. Giving each worker equal interest and shareholding in the industries in which they work creates less demand for bosses and management chains, thereby creating more laborers. Woodbey envisions a society in which, given these parameters, the majority would vote in favor of equal distribution of goods to all citizens given that all citizens are equal owners. He also envisions a severe drop in all criminal activity, and a schooling system that prepares men and women for their positions in specific industries. With equal opportunities among the people, the differences between people would disappear and rid the society of prejudice. Any citizen who does not follow the laws passed by the majority of voters would be forced to go without a living.

Later years, death, and legacy

According to one biographer, there is no record of Woodbey or his activities after 1915; however, an article by Woodbey was printed in a Chicago publication in 1909.  He was said to have been active in California as late as 1923.

Woodbey died in Los Angeles, California on August 27, 1937, at the home of his son William, survived by his third wife and three children.

Reverend George W. Slater, Jr. credited Woodbey for his conversion and understanding of Socialism. Slater took the mantle of Socialism from Woodbey and continued to teach and preach his message as a disciple of the Socialist movement.

Footnotes

Works

 The Bible and Socialism: A Conversation Between Two Preachers. San Diego, CA: G.W. Woodbey, 1904.
 The Distribution of Wealth. San Diego, CA: G.W. Woodbey, 1910.
 Why the Negro Should Vote the Socialist Ticket. Chicago: Socialist Party of America, n.d. [1910s].
 Method of Procedure in Baptist Church Trials. Nashville, TN: National Baptist Pub. Board, 1916.

Further reading

 Philip S. Foner, "From Slavery to Socialism: George Washington Woodbey, Black Socialist Preacher," in Jacob H. Dorn (ed.), Socialism and Christianity in Early 20th Century America. Westport, CT: Greenwood Press, 1998.

1854 births
1937 deaths
American Christian socialists
19th-century American slaves
Baptist ministers from the United States
Nebraska Prohibitionists
People from Johnson County, Tennessee
Socialist Party of America politicians from California
African-American people in California politics
Tennessee politicians
Writers from California
Writers from Nebraska
Writers from Tennessee
Baptist socialists
Activists from California
Baptists from Tennessee
Baptist Christianity in Nebraska
People from Omaha, Nebraska
Nebraska politicians
20th-century African-American people